The 2008 Nationwide Tour season ran from January 24 to November 9. The season consisted of 30 official money golf tournaments, five of which were played outside the United States. The top 25 players on the year-end money list earned their PGA Tour card for 2009.

Schedule
The following table lists official events during the 2008 season.

Money leaders
For full rankings, see 2008 Nationwide Tour graduates.

The money list was based on prize money won during the season, calculated in U.S. dollars. The top 25 players on the tour earned status to play on the 2009 PGA Tour.

Awards

See also
2008 Nationwide Tour graduates

Notes

References

Korn Ferry Tour seasons
Nationwide Tour